Aoranthe is a genus of flowering plants in the family Rubiaceae. It is found in tropical Africa.

Species 
 Aoranthe annulata (K.Schum.) Somers
 Aoranthe castaneofulva (S.Moore) Somers
 Aoranthe cladantha (K.Schum.) Somers
 Aoranthe nalaensis (De Wild.) Somers
 Aoranthe penduliflora (K.Schum.) Somers

References

External links 
 Aoranthe in the World Checklist of Rubiaceae

Rubiaceae genera
Gardenieae
Flora of Africa
Taxonomy articles created by Polbot